María Dolores Airport  is an airport serving Los Ángeles, capital of Bío Bío Province in the Bío Bío Region of Chile.

The Los Angeles VOR (Ident: MAD) is located on the field.

See also

Transport in Chile
List of airports in Chile

References

External links
María Dolores Airport at OpenStreetMap
María Dolores Airport at OurAirports

Airports in Chile
Airports in Biobío Region